Jane Preyer (born December 6, 1953) is an American former professional tennis player.

A native of North Carolina, Preyer competed on the professional tour in the 1970s and 1980s. Her best performances included a win over Evonne Goolagong Cawley at the 1981 National Panasonic Classic in Perth and a third round appearance at the 1982 Wimbledon Championships.

Preyer was women's head coach of Duke university for six seasons beginning in 1985 and guided the team to four Atlantic Coast Conference championships.

WTA Tour finals

Doubles (0-1)

References

External links
 
 

1953 births
Living people
American female tennis players
Tennis people from North Carolina
Duke Blue Devils women's tennis coaches
American tennis coaches